Herbert Jehle (5 March 1907, Stuttgart – 14 January 1983, Koblenz) was a German-American physicist.

Jehle graduated in 1930 from the Technische Hochschule Stuttgart with a degree in engineering and in 1933 from the Technische Hochschule Berlin with an engineering doctorate in textile manufacture. For the academic year 1933–1934 he studied theoretical physics at the University of Cambridge. In 1935/36 he worked for the Jahrbuch über die Fortschritte der Mathematik. As a convinced pacifist (associated with the Quakers) and a political dissident, he left Germany. In 1937/38 he was a research assistant at the University College in Southampton and from 1938 to 1940 at the Free University of Brussels. After internment at Camp de Gurs in the Pyrenees, he succeeded in escaping to the United States in 1941. He was from 1942 to 1946 at Harvard University, in 1946/47 at the Franklin Institute, in 1947/48 at the Institute for Advanced Study, from 1947 to 1949 at the University of Pennsylvania, and from 1949 to 1959 at the University of Nebraska. At George Washington University he was a professor from 1959 until his retirement in 1972 as professor emeritus. After his retirement he was a visiting professor at the University of Maryland, at the National Cancer Institute, at the University of Uppsala, and at the University of Amsterdam. He was a visiting professor at the Max Planck Institute for Physics and Astrophysics in 1973/74 and at the University of Munich from 1977 until his death. He died on the train near Koblenz.

As Richard Feynman describes in his Nobel Lecture, it was Herbert Jehle who gave him (at a beer party in the Nassau Tavern) in Princeton the decisive clue to Paul Dirac's work on the Lagrangian, which then led to Feynman's development of the path integral.

Silvan Schweber recounted his graduate study of physics at the University of Pennsylvania:

In 1950 Jehle was elected a Fellow of the American Physical Society.

References

20th-century German physicists
20th-century American physicists
University of Stuttgart alumni
Technical University of Berlin alumni
George Washington University faculty
Fellows of the American Physical Society
1907 births
1983 deaths
Gurs internment camp survivors
Scientists from Stuttgart
German emigrants to the United States